English actor and comedian Rowan Atkinson has appeared in twenty films and over thirty film series and over eight television advertisements.

Overview 
After university, Atkinson toured with Angus Deayton as his straight man in an act that was eventually filmed for a television show. After the success of the show, he did a one-off pilot for London Weekend Television in 1979 called Canned Laughter. Atkinson then went on to do Not the Nine O'Clock News for the BBC, produced by his friend John Lloyd. He featured in the show with Pamela Stephenson, Griff Rhys Jones and Mel Smith, and was one of the main sketch writers.

The success of Not the Nine O'Clock News led to him taking the lead role in the medieval sitcom The Black Adder (1983), which he also co-wrote with Richard Curtis. After a three-year gap, in part due to budgetary concerns, a second series was broadcast, this time written by Curtis and Ben Elton. Blackadder II (1986) followed the fortunes of one of the descendants of Atkinson's original character, this time in the Elizabethan era. The same pattern was repeated in the two more sequels Blackadder the Third (1987) (set in the Regency era), and Blackadder Goes Forth (1989) (set in World War I). The Blackadder series became one of the most successful of all BBC situation comedies, spawning television specials including Blackadder's Christmas Carol (1988), Blackadder: The Cavalier Years (1988), and later Blackadder: Back & Forth (1999), which was set at the turn of the Millennium. The final scene of "Blackadder Goes Forth" (when Blackadder and his men go "over the top" and charge into No-Man's-Land) has been described as "bold and highly poignant". During the 2014 centennial of the start of World War I, Michael Gove and war historian Max Hastings complained about the so-called "Blackadder version of history".

Atkinson's other creation, the hapless Mr. Bean, first appeared on New Year's Day in 1990 in a half-hour special for Thames Television. The character of Mr. Bean has been likened to a modern-day Buster Keaton, but Atkinson himself has stated that Jacques Tati's character Monsieur Hulot was the main inspiration.

Several sequels to Mr. Bean appeared on television until 1995, and the character later appeared in a feature film. Bean (1997) was directed by Mel Smith, Atkinson's colleague in Not the Nine O'Clock News. A second film, Mr. Bean's Holiday, was released in 2007. In 1995 and 1996, Atkinson portrayed Inspector Raymond Fowler in The Thin Blue Line television sitcom written by Ben Elton, which takes place in a police station located in fictitious Gasforth.

Atkinson has fronted campaigns for Kronenbourg, Fujifilm, and Give Blood. Atkinson appeared as a hapless and error-prone espionage agent named Richard Lathum in a long-running series of adverts for Barclaycard, on which character his title role in Johnny English and Johnny English Reborn was based. In 1999, he played the Doctor in  The Curse of Fatal Death, a special Doctor Who serial produced for Comic Relief. Atkinson appeared as the Star in a Reasonably Priced Car on Top Gear in July 2011, driving the Kia Cee'd around the track in 1:42.2, placing him at the top of the leaderboard until Matt LeBlanc later recorded a 1:42.1 lap time.

Atkinson appeared at the 2012 Summer Olympics opening ceremony in London as Mr. Bean in a comedy sketch during a performance of "Chariots of Fire", playing a repeated single note on synthesizer. He then lapsed into a dream sequence in which he joined the runners from the film of the same name (about the 1924 Summer Olympics), beating them in their iconic run along West Sands at St. Andrews, by riding in a minicab and tripping the front runner. Atkinson starred as Jules Maigret in Maigret, a series of TV films from ITV.

Atkinson's film career began with a supporting part in the James Bond movie Never Say Never Again (1983) and a leading role in Dead on Time (also 1983) with Nigel Hawthorne. He was in the 1988 Oscar-winning short film The Appointments of Dennis Jennings.  He appeared in Mel Smith's directorial debut The Tall Guy (1989) and appeared alongside Anjelica Huston and Mai Zetterling in Roald Dahl's The Witches (1990). He played the part of Dexter Hayman in Hot Shots! Part Deux (1993), a parody of Rambo III, starring Charlie Sheen.

Atkinson gained further recognition with his turn as a verbally bumbling vicar in Four Weddings and a Funeral (1994) and featured in Disney's The Lion King (also 1994) as the voice of Zazu the red-billed hornbill. He also sang the song I Just Can't Wait to Be King in The Lion King. Atkinson continued to appear in supporting roles in comedies, including Rat Race (2001), Scooby-Doo (2002), Love Actually (2003) and the crime comedy Keeping Mum (2005), which also starred Kristin Scott Thomas, Maggie Smith and Patrick Swayze.

In addition to his supporting roles, Atkinson has also had success as a leading man. His television character Mr. Bean debuted on the big screen with Bean (1997) to international success. A sequel, Mr. Bean's Holiday (2007), also became an international success. He has also starred in the James Bond parody Johnny English (2003), its sequel, Johnny English Reborn (2011) and its second sequel; Johnny English Strikes Again (2018).

Film

Television

Commercials

Music videos

Atkinson also appeared in a song in the 1970s, "I like trucking". The song was made of "Not the nine O clock news".

References 

Male actor filmographies
British filmographies
Filmography